Shorty Rogers Courts the Count is an album by American jazz trumpeter, composer and arranger Shorty Rogers, released on the RCA Victor label in 1954.

Reception

Allmusic noted "Having found his own voice through stints with Woody Herman and Stan Kenton, Rogers gets a chance to show his appreciation for one of his early influences, with charts that both reflect the supple bounce of Basie and the complexly cool sound the trumpeter had been forging since the late '40s".

Track listing 
All compositions by Shorty Rogers except where noted.
 "Jump for Me" (Count Basie)- 4:00	
 "Topsy" (Edgar Battle, Eddie Durham) - 3:21	
 "It's Sand, Man" (Ed Lewis) - 3:00	
 "Basie Eyes" (Shorty Rogers) - 3:27	
 "Doggin' Around" (Battle, Herschel Evans) - 2:36	
 "Down for Double" (Freddie Green) - 2:57	
 "Over and Out" - 3:15	
 "H & J" (Harry Edison, Jo Jones) -3:02	
 "Taps Miller" (Basie) - 3:23	
 "Tickletoe" (Lester Young) - 2:40	
 "Swingin' the Blues" (Basie, Durham) - 4:29	
 "Walk, Don't Run" - 3:15
Recorded in Los Angeles, CA on February 2, 1954 (tracks 2-5), February 9, 1954 (tracks 1, 6, 7 & 11) and March 3, 1954 (tracks 8-10 & 12)

Personnel 
Shorty Rogers - trumpet, arranger
Pete Candoli (tracks 1 & 6-12), Harry Edison, Maynard Ferguson, Conrad Gozzo, Clyde Reasinger (tracks 2-5), - trumpet 
Milt Bernhart, Harry Betts - trombone
Bob Enevoldsen - valve trombone 
John Graas - French horn 
Paul Sarmento - tuba 
Jimmy Giuffre - clarinet, tenor saxophone 
Herb Geller, Bud Shank - alto saxophone 
Bob Cooper (tracks 2-5 & 8-12), Bill Holman (tracks 1, 6, 7 & 11), Zoot Sims (tracks 2-5, 8-10 & 12) - tenor saxophone
Bob Gordon (tracks 1, 6, 7 & 11) - baritone saxophone
Marty Paich - piano
Curtis Counce - bass 
Shelly Manne - drums

References 

Shorty Rogers albums
1954 albums
RCA Records albums
Albums arranged by Shorty Rogers